Park Avenue Logger is a 1937 American lumberjack Western film directed by David Howard. The film is also known as Millionaire Playboy in the United Kingdom and Tall Timber (American reissue title). It is based on the short story of the same name by Bruce Hutchison that appeared in the 30 November 1935 issue of the Saturday Evening Post.

Plot 
Mike Curran believes his son Grant is an effete aesthete and decides to toughen him up by sending him under a false name to work at one of Mike's logging camps. Unknown to the elder Curren, his son spends his evenings as a masked wrestler; Grant believes his family would be embarrassed if they knew the truth.

Also unknown to Mike Curran is the fact that his friend and  logging camp boss Ben Morton and his stooge Paul Sangar are embezzling money from the Curren owned camp and are trying to force Peggy O'Shea's rival logging camp out of business by deadly acts of sabotage.

The pair send Grant to work at Peggy's camp with a group of handpicked idlers. The hard and dangerous tasks that Paul orders him to do backfire when Grant sets a faster pace that the workmen emulate. Grant moves in on Peggy O'Shea who Paul believes is his girl. When Peggy makes it clear to Paul that she prefers Grant to him, Paul responds by hiring three toughs to threaten Grant to make him leave. After Grant laughs in their face and won't be provoked, Peggy believes him a coward. The trio wait outside a dance hall to give Grant a beating, but they discover the hard way that Grant is a man not to be trifled with. When they gain consciousness they run for their lives.

Paul finds Grant's photograph and real identity in a magazine and falsely tells Peggy that Grant's father sent him to put her out of business and that Grant is the one responsible for the sabotage. Peggy throws Grant out of her employ and agrees to marry Paul out of spite...

Cast 
George O'Brien as Grant Curran
Beatrice Roberts as Peggy O'Shea
Willard Robertson as Ben Morton
Ward Bond as Paul Sangar
Bert Hanlon as Nick
Gertrude Short as Margy MacLean
Lloyd Ingraham as Mike Curran
George Rosener as Matt O'Shea
Robert Emmett O'Connor as Police Sergeant
Brother Jonathan as Wrestler

References

External links 

1937 films
American romantic drama films
American Western (genre) films
American action films
American black-and-white films
1937 romantic drama films
1937 Western (genre) films
Films directed by David Howard
Logging in the United States
Films based on short fiction
Films set in forests
RKO Pictures films
Films about lumberjacks
1930s English-language films
1930s American films